Garra notata, the Tenasserim garra, is a species of ray-finned fish in the genus Garra.
This species is also known as Tenasserim garra, after the Tenasserim Hills.

It lives between 120 m and 1500 m in rocky mountain streams, rapid zones and waterfalls of the lower Salween and Great Tenasserim (Tanintharyi) basins in Myanmar (Talwar and Jhingran 1990), Yunnan (southern China) and water courses adjacent to these regions in western Thailand. This species reaches a maximum length of 100 – 120 mm.

References 

Garra
Fish described in 1860
Taxa named by Edward Blyth